Muhammad ibn Rumahis was a Muslim Admiral in 10th Century Spain. He is remembered in Jewish History for capturing of four Babylonian Rabbis and ransoming them to the Jewish communities of Alexandria, Kairouan, Spain, and one unidentified other location.

Personal life 

He was born somewhere in the north of the Iberian Peninsula, where he was taken captive in a raid by the caliph Abd al-Rahman III (891-961). When the Caliph became acquainted with his seafaring abilities, he was manumitted and named Admiral of the Caliphate fleet, participating in various actions from 940 until his death in 360 AH (971 CE).

Four Captive Rabbis 

According to Abraham Ibn Daud's Sefer HaKabbala, Ibn Rumahis captured a boat containing Rabbis Shemariah ben Elchanan, Chushiel (father of Rabbeinu Chananel), Moshe ben Chanoch, and one other anonymous Rabbi while the four were traveling to raise money for the Babylonian Talmudical academies. Knowing the emphasis Jews placed on redeeming captives, Ibn Rumahis traveled the Mediterranean, selling Rav Shemariah to the Alexandrian Jews, Rav Chushiel to the Kairouan Jews, and Rav Moshe to the Spanish Jews. This is attributed as the source of the spread of Jewish learning from Babylonia to Spain and North Africa. Heinrich Graetz posited that the fourth captive was Rabbi Natan ben Yitzchak HaBavli, who settled, and was presumably sold, to the Jewish community in Narbonne.

References

Spanish Muslims
Generals of the Umayyad Caliphate
10th-century Arabs
971 deaths
Year of birth unknown